Olib is a Croatian island in northern Dalmatia, located northwest of Zadar, southwest of Pag, southeast of Lošinj and just east of Silba with an area of 26.14 km2.

History
Greek geographer Strabo mentions a settlement named Aloip, which was inhabited by the Liburnians. During the Roman rule, Aloip was rebuilt in a different location, in the island's south-west.

Croats colonized the island from mid-7th to late 8th century. Another wave of Croatian inhabitants arrived in the mid to late 15th century, from Vrlika in the Cetinska Krajina region in Split-Dalmatia County, fleeing the Ottoman invasions. The Chakavian dialect of Croatian is spoken on Olib. Residents call themselves Olibljani.

The island has many historic buildings and ruins. Among these are the Parish Church Assumption of Mary with its collection of antiquities including Glagolitic codices dating back to the 17th century (housed in the treasury of the parish rectory), the stone Tower or "Kula" built for protection from pirates, and the ruins of St. Paul's Church and Monastery which was abandoned in the 13th century. 

In addition to the parish church of the Assumption of Mary, Olib has three other churches. St. Anastasia is situated inside the village cemetery, St. Nicholas is located on the cove of Porat, and St. Rocco is close to the port of Samotvorac.

Modern-day Olib
The traditional products of Olib include wine, olive oil, and cheese. Most of the food is consumed locally rather than being sold in the market.

There is no water supply network on Olib so all homes on the island are built with cisterns to capture rainwater. During the summer months, the island receives an additional supply of water carried by ships if needed.

Although the year-round population only hovers around 100, that number is much larger during the summer months when both descendants of the island's native population as well as international tourists come to visit.

Olib is connected to the mainland by ferry to Zadar via the islands of Silba and Premuda. The journey to the mainland takes approximately two hours on a catamaran and up to three and a half hours by ferry. Cars are forbidden to be used for transport on the island, instead have to be parked in a designated area adjacent to the harbor.

Demographics

According to the first result of the 2021 census, the town of Olib has 113 residents and 64 occupied private households.

References

Bibliography
 

Islands of Croatia
Islands of the Adriatic Sea
Landforms of Zadar County